"Bongo Bong" is the first solo single by Manu Chao, from his debut album, Clandestino. It is a remake of "King of Bongo", a track from Manu Chao's previous band, Mano Negra. The title and lyrics are taken from the 1939 jazz song "King of Bongo Bong" by Black American trumpeter Roy Eldridge. It also uses the background music from Black Uhuru's song "Bull ina di Pen", from their 1984 album, Anthem. The song is part of a medley with "Je ne t'aime plus" on Clandestino. Moreover, the music has been reused for other songs, such as "Mr. Bobby", which was first released on this single before being re-recorded for Chao's second album, Próxima Estación: Esperanza, and "Homens", from the same record.

In 2006, a cover version by Robbie Williams, combining "Bongo Bong" and "Je ne t'aime plus" in one track, appeared on his album Rudebox and was released as a single of its own in 2007. German singer Lou Bega covered the song on his 2021 album, 90s Cruiser. It has also been remixed by breakbeat artists Cut & Run, drum and bass duo Ed Solo, Deekline, the band Noisia, and German singer Max Raabe.

Chart positions

Weekly charts

Year-end charts

Certifications

Track listing
 "Bongo Bong"
 "Je ne t'aime plus"
 "Mr. Bobby"
 "Bienvenido a Tijuana"

References

1998 songs
1999 singles
Manu Chao songs
Reggae songs